Kurze may refer to:

 Kurze, Palghar, a village in India
 Kurzeh, a village in Iran
 Kurze Mountains in Antarctica
 Max Kurze, German military officer